Comparethemarket is a UK price comparison website, founded in 2006, that is part of the BGL Group. The website also offers other on-line companies the ability to provide their customers with a co-branded or white labelled comparison service.

In 2009, the company launched an advertising campaign featuring a series of meerkat characters, after which it became the third-largest price comparison website in the UK.

History
The website was set up by Budget Group (now BGL Group) in early 2006, following a decision to sell its high street business to Swinton.

In 2012, Comparethemarket.com.au launched its comparison service in Australia. The Australian company's television advertisements also feature the meerkat characters Aleksandr Orlov and his Head of IT, Sergei. However, these ads differ from the UK's, with one such storyline revealing the meerkats have purchased comparethemarket.com.au.

In September 2017, it was announced the company was under investigation by the competition regulator surrounding allegations regarding most favoured nation clauses with home insurance providers.

Comparison products
Comparethemarket allows customers to compare prices on a number of insurance products including car, home, van, life, pet, travel and over 50s insurance. It has also expanded in to the comparison of items that can be switched such as energy/utilities, broadband and digital TV, as well as a range of financial products such as loans, credit cards, current accounts and mortgages.

Compare the Meerkat campaign

On 5 January 2008, the company launched an advertising campaign featuring a CGI meerkat character named "Aleksandr Orlov" who pleads with viewers looking for cheap car insurance to stop confusing his meerkat comparison website comparethemeerkat.com with comparethemarket.com, due to the similarity between the words meerkat and market. As part of the campaign, Comparethemeerkat.com was created which does indeed allow visitors to compare meerkats.

On 26 November 2012, the website started sponsoring the long-running soap opera Coronation Street on ITV in a three-year deal, costing around £30 million.

Other adverts
In December 2012 another advert was launched this time featuring Maurice Wigglethorpe-Throom (played by Robert Webb) the founder of Compare the Market and his assistant Spencer who find out about Aleksandr (who makes a cameo appearance in a photograph) and Compare the Meerkat.

Controversy
In 2018, the BBC reported that the CMA found “most favoured nation” clauses in Comparethemarket's contracts with insurance companies which effectively banned them from selling their home insurance at cheaper prices on rival websites. The CMA chief executive, Andrea Coscelli, said: “Our investigation has provisionally found that Comparethemarket has broken the law by preventing home insurers from offering lower prices elsewhere. This could result in people paying higher premiums than they need to.”
In November 2020 Comparethemarket was fined £17.9 million by the Competition and Markets Authority for breaking competition law as a result of their investigations.

See also 
Moneysupermarket.com
Confused.com
Uswitch
Go.Compare

References

External links 
 
 Meerkat Movies
 BGL Group History
 Result and review 2009 to 2010 - p11 
 Peterborough News "Meerkat mania was born in Peterborough"
 Compare the Market Australian Site

Financial services companies established in 2008
Internet properties established in 2006
Companies based in Peterborough
Comparison shopping websites
2006 establishments in the United Kingdom